Proud To Commit Commercial Suicide is a live album by industrial metal band Nailbomb and captures the band's only live appearance at the 1995 Dynamo Open Air Festival. The album cover is a picture of the aftermath of the infamous Jonestown suicides. The album's title is in reference to the fact that the band promised that they would only ever release one album.

Track listing
All tracks written by Max Cavalera and Alex Newport, except where noted.

Tracks 12–13 are studio recorded tracks.

Personnel

Nailbomb
Max Cavalera - Vocals, Guitars
Alex Newport - Vocals, Guitars

Additional musicians
Rhys Fulber - Keyboards, Sampler
Richie Bujinowski - Additional Guitars
Dave Edwardson - Bass (tracks 1-7, 9-11)
Scoot Doom - Bass, Vocals (track 8)
Evan Seinfeld - Bass (track 11)
Igor Cavalera - Drums (tracks 1-3, 10, 11)
Barry Schneider - Drums (tracks 4-6)
D.H. Peligro - Drums, Backing Vocals (tracks 7-9)

Production
Produced by Alex Newport and Max Cavalera
Recorded and Engineered by Steven Remote
Mixed by Alex Newport and Rusty D'Agnolo

References

External links
"Proud To Commit Commercial Suicide" at discogs

Nailbomb albums
Albums produced by Max Cavalera
Albums produced by Alex Newport
1995 live albums
Roadrunner Records live albums